A joint commission may be any commission established jointly by several authorities (such as sovereign countries, administrative agencies, academic medical societies, or others). 

Thus, the proper noun Joint Commission may refer to:

 International Joint Commission of the United States and Canada
 Joint Commission, a United States-based nonprofit organization that accredits more than 20,000 health care organizations and programs in the United States
 Joint Commission International, part of Joint Commission (see Joint Commission International)
 Joint Control Commission of Russia, Moldova and Transnistria